Risti Parish was a rural municipality in Lääne County, Estonia, that existed from 1992 to 2013.

After the municipal elections held on 20 October 2013, Risti Parish was merged with neighbouring Oru and Taebla parishes and a new Lääne-Nigula Parish was established.

In 2008 it had a population of 863 and an area of 167.8 km².

Populated places
Risti Parish had 1 small borough (Risti) and 4 villages: Jaakna, Kuijõe, Piirsalu and Rõuma.

References

This article includes content from the Estonian Wikipedia article Risti vald.

External links
 

Former municipalities of Estonia
Geography of Lääne County